Gwenda Matthews married name Gwenda Hurst (born 6 June 1944) is a British athlete.

Athletics career
She competed in the women's high jump at the 1964 Summer Olympics.

She was a National championship runner-up behind Mary Peters in the Pentathlon.

She represented England in the high jump and long jump, at the 1966 British Empire and Commonwealth Games in Kingston, Jamaica.

References

1944 births
Living people
Athletes (track and field) at the 1964 Summer Olympics
British female high jumpers
Olympic athletes of Great Britain
Place of birth missing (living people)
Athletes (track and field) at the 1966 British Empire and Commonwealth Games
Commonwealth Games competitors for England